Allan Bester (born March 26, 1964) is a Canadian former professional ice hockey goaltender. He played in the National Hockey League with the Toronto Maple Leafs, Detroit Red Wings, and Dallas Stars between 1984 and 1996.

Playing career
Bester was born in Hamilton, Ontario. He played with the Brantford Alexanders of the OHL for three seasons before moving on to professional hockey. He was drafted into the National Hockey League (NHL) by the Toronto Maple Leafs in the third round (48th overall) of the 1983 NHL Entry Draft.

Bester spent parts of 11 seasons in the NHL, beginning in 1983–84. He spent eight years in Toronto, and then was traded to the Detroit Red Wings in 1991. He spent most of his career moving between the NHL and American Hockey League (AHL). In 1992, Bester won a Calder Cup with the Adirondack Red Wings. He was awarded the Jack A. Butterfield Trophy as playoff MVP. Bester made a short return to the NHL after a four-year absence, playing ten games for the Dallas Stars in the mid-1990s.

Bester ended his career in the International Hockey League (IHL). He played with both the San Diego Gulls and Orlando Solar Bears before announcing his retirement in August 1998.

Career statistics

Regular season and playoffs

International

References

External links
 
 Allan Bester at hockeygoalies.org

1964 births
Living people
Adirondack Red Wings players
Brantford Alexanders players
Canadian ice hockey goaltenders
Dallas Stars players
Detroit Red Wings players
Ice hockey people from Ontario
Newmarket Saints players
Orlando Solar Bears (IHL) players
San Diego Gulls (IHL) players
Sportspeople from Hamilton, Ontario
St. Catharines Saints players
Toronto Maple Leafs draft picks
Toronto Maple Leafs players